The Foreign Marriage Act 1892, Chapter 23 (56 & 56 Vict.), is an Act of the Parliament of the United Kingdom of Great Britain and Ireland "to consolidate Enactments relating to the Marriage of British Subjects outside the United Kingdom", and sets out the rules regarding the recognition in the United Kingdom of marriages conducted abroad (the procedures for the giving and display of notices, oaths and solemnisation, and their fees, and other matters).

Until their repeal, sections of the Act also defined the procedures used for consular marriages, which until recently – with the abolition of extraterritoriality for British subjects abroad or within the British Empire, the obsolescence of the class of the British Protected Person and the development of the concept of Lex loci celebrationis and the qualifications for its invocation (especially by the case of Radwan v Radwan (1972) (3 All ER 967), which effectively rendered foreign and Commonwealth consular marriages and British consular marriages alike invalid in England) in English law – allowed British subjects to get married abroad but under the matrimonial laws of England rather than foreign laws, through the British consul-general, consul, consulate or consular section.

The Act also defined the procedures for marriage by members of Her Majesty's Armed Forces in the United Kingdom outside of the United Kingdom.

The Act is substantially amended by the Foreign Marriage (Amendment) Act 1988.

The Act is repealed by Section 13 of the Marriage (Same-Sex Couples) Act 2013, which came into force on 3 June 2014. However, the repeal did not extend to Northern Ireland. Marriages overseas are now provided in Schedule 6 of the Marriage (Same-Sex Couples) Act 2013. The Act was repealed in Northern Ireland by The Marriage (Same-sex Couples) and Civil Partnership (Opposite-sex Couples) (Northern Ireland) Regulations 2019.

In the Republic of Ireland, although specifically retained by name and not to be repealed, with unamended specific references to "British", "the United Kingdom", "England", "the Church of England" and "British subjects", the Act is otherwise considered obsolete.

See also 
 Marriage in the United Kingdom
 Legal consequences of marriage and civil partnership in England and Wales

References 

Marriage law in the United Kingdom
Irish law
United Kingdom Acts of Parliament 1892
1892 in law